Lessland is a historic home located near Culpeper in Orange County, Virginia. It was built in 1871, and is a two-story, three-bay, gable roofed brick residence with a rear brick ell in the Italianate style. It has a central passage plan and sits on an English basement. The front facade features a
portico with four two-story Ionic order columns and a shallow pediment over the central bay.  Also on the property are the contributing law office, an icehouse, a meathouse, and a granary.

It was listed on the National Register of Historic Places in 1999.

References

Houses on the National Register of Historic Places in Virginia
Italianate architecture in Virginia
Houses completed in 1871
Houses in Orange County, Virginia
National Register of Historic Places in Orange County, Virginia